Vidyaranyapura is situated in the northern part of Bangalore city in the state of Karnataka, India. Vidyaranyapura, along with several other extensions of the city, comes under a constituency called Byatarayanapura. It comes under the Greater Bangalore jurisdiction of the Bruhat Bengaluru Mahanagara Palike (BBMP).

History
Vidyaranyapura is a colony that was formed in the late 1970s. It was formerly owned by a rich landlord, who still owns a large mango garden called Dinshaw Estate. Legends suggest that it may have been a battlefield. This is supported by the name of a nearby place called Dandina Kodigehalli ('Dandu' in Kannada means a cantonment or military camp). The township is named after the great Kannada poet, saint, and priest, Vidyaranya.

Geography

It is a composite locality comprising multiple sub-blocks and layouts: AMS Layout, Ganesha Layout, Balaji Layout, Defence Colony, Nanjappa Layout, Chamundeshwari Layout, Srinidhi layout, BEL Layout (Bharat Electronics Ltd.), Hindustan Machine Tools (HMT) layout, and National Tuberculosis Institute NTI layout.

Vidyaranyapura is located close to government sector factories like BEL [Bharat Electronics Limited] and HMT [Hindustan Machine Tools]. Premier educational institution such as the Centre for Liquid Crystal Research, University of Agricultural Sciences, Bangalore, Indian Institute of Science, National Centre for Biological Sciences, Jawaharlal Nehru Centre for Advanced Scientific Research, and TIFR Centre for Applicable Mathematics are within few minutes drive and are also well connected by Bangalore Metropolitan Transport Corporation bus services. Thindlu is one of the oldest areas in Bengaluru and is one kilometer to the east of Vidyaranyapura post office and has an ancient temple of the lord Virabhadra (a form of the lord Shiva).

Agriculture
Vidyaranyapura is west of the University of Agricultural Sciences, GKVK, and Thindlu. The area has a variety of trees and plants, which were planted by the Forest Department while converting it into a residential area. The native tree is predominantly the eucalyptus. The soil is very rich in nutrients and has a distinct red color.

Biodiversity
Vidyaranyapura is known for the existence of a varied number of species. It also houses some beautiful lakes. The location is surrounded by ample greenery. Agricultural landforms a major part. There is a mango grove (earlier Dinshaw Estate) at the center of the locality. Soil humus content is high in the area, and red soil is found majorly. Almost all diversity of plants can be found or grown here, including those of medicinal value. The area does also has some animal diversity. The locality has a huge flock of pigeons. Rare birds in Bangalore like the Greater coucal are seen at silent places, sparrows can be found near to the Last Bus Stop. Cobra snakes are very common here and can be found in groups. Narasipura lake is home for a few turtles and mongooses. Common Indian toad and bullfrog are the various others traced in the area. Even a pangolin was found in the area in 2002.

Birds which occasionally dwell in Vidyaranyapura are lesser whistling teal, black headed ibis, purple swamphen, red wattled lapwing, white-cheeked barbet, small green barbet, pied wagtail (Motacilla alba), egret, little grebe, little cormorant, purple heron, oriental darter, spotted dove, bulbul, night heron, Indian spot-billed duck, sandpiper and whistling duck.

Notable residents
 Obaid Siddiqi - scientist and Padma Vibushan awardee
 Sreesanth - former Indian cricketer, cine artiste
 Rajesh - Kannada actor and theater artist
 Abhijeeth - Kannada actor in Yajamana and a few other celebrated movies
 K Chandrasekhar - a former Indian scientist and aerospace engineer, was one of the seven accused in the 1994 Isro spy case

Location

See also 
 Yelahanka
 Thindlu
 Jalahalli

References

External links
http://www.thehindu.com/news/cities/bangalore/will-kere-clean-up-see-partial-success/article5197901.ece
http://newindianexpress.com/cities/bangalore/Today-innocence-is-out-malice-is-in/2013/11/04/article1871115.ece

Neighbourhoods in Bangalore